"The Varioni Brothers" is a short story by J. D. Salinger, first published in the Saturday Evening Post on 17 July 1943.  Joe Varioni is a sensitive artist whose immense promise as a literary novelist is apparently thwarted by the manipulations of his musician brother, Sonny, who forces him to write commercial song lyrics instead of his book. The brothers are hugely successful in their songwriting endeavours, but Joe is shot dead in error at one of their celebrated parties by the hired gunman of a mobster (the intended target being Sonny, who has welched on a gambling debt). Years later, prematurely aged and deeply remorseful, Sonny attempts to reconstruct his late brother's novel-in-progress from its extant fragments.

References
 Paul Levine, "J. D. Salinger: The Development of the Misfit Hero", Twentieth Century Literature 4 (1958) 92-99

1943 short stories
Short stories by J. D. Salinger
Works originally published in The Saturday Evening Post